Dai Suli (21 November 1919 – 22 January 2000) was a People's Republic of China politician. He was born in Xiangyuan County, Shanxi Province. He was governor of Henan Province (1981–1983). He was a member of the Central Advisory Commission.

References

忆戴苏理同志. 大河网. [2011-10-16].
邵文杰, 河南省地方史志编纂委员会. 《河南省志: 共产党志》. 河南人民出版社. 1997年: 422页.
辽宁省地方志编纂委员会办公室. 《辽宁省志: 大事记》. 辽宁科学技术出版社. 2006年: 595页.

1919 births
2000 deaths
People's Republic of China politicians from Shanxi
Chinese Communist Party politicians from Shanxi
Governors of Henan
Members of the 12th Central Committee of the Chinese Communist Party
Members of the Central Advisory Commission
Politicians from Changzhi